Reine Swart (née Malan; born 17 May 1990) is a South African director, writer and actress. She starred in the Afrikaans surf film Die Pro (2015). She appeared alongside Tye Sheridan, Bel Powley and Emory Cohen in the film Detour (2016). On television, she appeared in the SyFy series Dominion, the kykNET series, Villa Rosa, and the CBBC series Jamillah and Aladdin.

Swart played the lead in Darrell Roodt's Siembamba (2017). Reine worked alongside James Badge Dale in 20th Century Fox's The Empty Man (2018).

In 2018, Swart made her feature film directorial debut on the horror film Heks, which was released in South Africa under the title Her Mask and in the United States as The Hex in 2020. That same year, Swart was part of an ensemble cast in the horror-comedy Triggered, which was released in the United States in November 2020 and in South Africa in January 2021. She also co-wrote the upcoming horror movie Flesh, starring Danielle Harris, with the film's director, Chris McGowan.

Early life
Swart attended the Afrikaanse Hoër Meisieskool. She graduated with a degree in industrial engineering from the University of Pretoria in 2012.

Filmography

Film

Television

References

External links 
  
 Reine Swart on Twitter 
 Reine Swart on Instagram

21st-century South African actresses
Living people
People from Pretoria
South African film actresses
South African television actresses
White South African people
1990 births